Goodalochana () is a 2017 Indian Malayalam-language comedy drama film directed by Thomas Sebastian and written by Dhyan Sreenivasan from a story by Anoop Joseph. The film stars Dhyan Sreenivasan, Aju Varghese, Sreenath Bhasi and Hareesh Perumanna, along with Alencier Ley Lopez and Niranjana Anoop. The music was composed by Shaan Rahman.

Plot 
The film is about the life of four unemployed youths named Varun (Dhyan Sreenivasan), Prakashan (Aju Varghese), Ajaz (Sreenath Bhasi) and Jamsheer (Hareesh Kanaran) who have a lot of expectations in their life and are looking for an opportunity to be successful. All their ventures lead to failures. They start different businesses including a taxi company by pledging their homes. They have to amass huge debt and later use a painting that Varun's father has looked after as a prized possession on the pretext that it will fetch them a lot of money. That effort also turns in vain and they have ventures into new opportunities. Later, Ajaz tries to triplicate the money his father gave him to go to Dubai for work with a racket and gets cheated. Later the story ends saying that the four youngsters are still struggling with their lives to get settled. Varun’s father Das has a famous painting in his cafe. The gang steals this painting and sells for five lakhs. Das tells them that the painting is worth a crore and tricks them into buying back the painting from Padma , an art buyer for galleries, and keeps it back in the cafe. Das scolds them and the friends split up after a huge fight. The friends are now enemies and Varun and artist Prakashan gets calls asking for         Bos , which is Prakashans signature. Varun calls Padma offering to sell a Bos painting and goes to kochi to meet her. The painting is of their friendship and shows all the friends against an ocean backdrop. Padma offers them a space to exhibit the painting at her exhibition. They attach a price tag of ten lakh rupees , believing it will solve all their debt. The other friends also arrive in Kochi. The painting exhibition starts but it fails to sell. Padma takes it off their hands. She reveals that she knew Prakash was Bos all along and that he is a talented painter. She pays them a handsome amount of ten lakhs. They repay their friends all the debts. All of them meet up and regain the friendship.

Cast 

 Dhyan Sreenivasan as Varun
 Niranjana Anoop as Fida
 Aju Varghese as Prakashan
 Sreenath Bhasi as Ajaz
 Hareesh Kanaran as Jamsheer
 Vishnu Govindhan as Sharaf
 Alencier Ley Lopez as Das
 Bhagath Manuel as Atthar
Mamta Mohandas as Padma Raghuram

Production
The film produced by Dr.Ajas Ibrahim.The film marks the debut of Dhyan Sreenivasan as screenwriter. It was written based on a story by Anoop Joseph.

Soundtrack 
The music is composed by Shaan Rahman along with Gopi Sundar.

Release
Goodalochana was released on 3 November 2017.

References

External links 
 

2017 comedy-drama films
2017 films
2010s Malayalam-language films
Indian comedy-drama films
Films scored by Shaan Rahman